Bus services are provided throughout the Greater Montreal region of Canada under the Exo brand.

History 
Prior to June 2017, bus service within the greater region of Montréal was provided by a number of different local and regional transit agencies known as Conseils Intermunicipal de Transport (CIT), or Inter-municipal transit commissions. In addition, a few suburban towns also ran their own transit services. All of these CITs and local agencies were, however, integrated logistically and collected fares under the umbrella of the former Agence métropolitaine de transport (AMT), a provincial agency created in 1997 to manage and integrate road transport and public transportation in Greater Montreal, as well as operate commuter rail for the region.

On June 1, 2017, the AMT was disbanded and replaced by two new entities, the Autorité régionale de transport métropolitain (ARTM), mandated to plan and integrate public transit and fares across the Greater Montreal region, and the Réseau de transport métropolitain (RTM), to organize and run the commuter train network and unite all public transport expertise of the former AMT with that of the CIT transit organizations in the northern and southern suburbs, including paratransit services.

The RTM took over service operation of over twelve former CITs and local transit agencies:

 AMT's own express bus lines
 CIT Haut-Saint-Laurent
 CIT La Presqu'Île
 CIT Laurentides
 CIT Le Richelain
 CIT Roussillon
 CIT Sorel-Varennes
 CIT Vallée du Richelieu
 CITSO (Sud-Ouest)
 RTCR de la MRC de L'Assomption
Urbis transport urbain des moulins
Keolis
Conseil Régional de transport de Lanaudière  
 Sainte-Julie public transit

Bus routes 
Through its subsidiaries Exo runs multiple bus lines serving Montréal suburbs.

North Shore 

 Exo L'Assomption and Terrebonne - Mascouche sector
 Exo Laurentides sector

South Shore 

 Exo Chambly-Richelieu-Carignan sector
 Exo du Haut-Saint-Laurent sector
 Exo Le Richelain sector
 Exo Roussillon sector
 Exo Sainte-Julie sector
 Exo Sorel-Varennes sector
 Exo Sud-Ouest sector
 Exo de la Vallée du Richelieu sector  
 Express Chevrier 90/Express Terminus Centre-Ville 90 links Brossard-Chevrier Park and Ride to the MontrealTerminus Centre-Ville using Van Hool AG300 buses. It is run by the Réseau de transport de Longueuil which is not part of Exo.
 La Presqu'Île sector

See also 
 Autorité régionale de transport métropolitain
 Saint-Jean-sur-Richelieu public transit

References

External links 
  Réseau de transport métropolitain buses
  Réseau de transport métropolitain buses (EN)

Bus services
Lists of bus routes in Canada